Machar Colony (Bengali: মাছাব় কলোনি) or Machiara Colony (Bengali: মাছিয়াব়া কলোনি) is an unplanned settlement in Karachi, Pakistan, located near the Port of Karachi and Lyari. The settlement is spread over an area of almost 4 square kilometers, and is home to about 700,000 people. It is considered to be one of the most dilapidated slums in Karachi.

Most people in the neighborhood are involved in the fishing industry and consequently the area is also known as Fisherman's Colony, with the word Machar derived from the Sindhi word for fisherman machera. Residents of Machar Colony are employed by the fishing industry as shrimp peelers, fishermen, fish cleaners, or labourers in the ship breaking industry. Some of their homes are built on stilts over the water. The few flourishing businessmen that the colony has produced are in the fishing business, which is almost exclusively dominated by the Bengalis. A large majority of residents are Bengali, although there are minorities of Afghans, Kutchis, Pashtuns, Punjabis, Rohingya, and Sindhis.

See also
 Bengalis in Pakistan
 Muhammadi Colony
 Humdard Muhallah Committee

References

External links
 Karachi Website
 Kiamari Town
 Machar Colony on Wikimapia

Neighbourhoods of Karachi
Kiamari Town
Bengali-speaking countries and territories